The 2009–10 Morgan State Bears men's basketball team represented Morgan State University in the 2009–10 college basketball season. This was head coach Todd Bozeman's fourth season at Morgan State. The Bears competed in the Mid-Eastern Athletic Conference and played their home games at Talmadge L. Hill Field House. They finished the season 27–10, 15–1 in MEAC play to win the regular season championship. They also won the 2010 MEAC men's basketball tournament for the second consecutive year to receive the conferences automatic bid to the 2010 NCAA Division I men's basketball tournament. They earned a 15 seed in the East Region where they lost to 2 seed and AP #6 West Virginia in the first round.

Roster
Source

Schedule and results

|-
!colspan=9 style=| Regular Season

|-
!colspan=9 style=| MEAC tournament

|-
!colspan=10 style=| NCAA tournament

References

Morgan State Bears
Morgan State
Morgan State Bears men's basketball seasons
Morgan
Morgan